Neel may refer to:

Given name 
 Neel Akasher Neechey, Bengali language film director
 Neel Doff (1858–1942), Dutch author
 Neel E. Kearby (1911–1944), military pilot
 Neel Jani (born 1983), Swiss race car driver
 Neel Kashkari, Interim Assistant Secretary of the Treasury for Financial Stability
 Neel Reid (1885–1926), architect

Surname 

 Alice Neel (1900–1984), American portrait painter
 Boyd Neel (1905–1981), English conductor and academic
 David Neel, a Canadian writer, photographer, and artist
 Elizabeth Neel (born 1975), artist
 Prashanth Neel (born 1980), Indian film director
 Roy Neel, politician
 Troy Neel (born 1965), professional baseball player

Néel as a surname 
 Alexandra David-Néel (1868–1969), a French explorer, anarchist, spiritualist, and writer
 Louis Néel (1904–2000), a French physicist who received the 1970 Nobel prize
 Néel temperature, at which an antiferromagnetic material becomes paramagnetic

Locations 
 Neel, Alabama, an unincorporated community in Morgan County, Alabama, United States

Other uses
 Alice Neel (documentary) film about painter Alice Neel
 Nil in the Indian numbering system
 Neel Kamal (1947 film) directed by Kidar Nath Sharma
 Neel Trimarans, a multihull sailboat company founded and managed by Eric Bruneel and based in La Rochelle, France

Surnames of Norman origin

fr:Neel
ja:ニール